Evolución may refer to:

 Evolución (band), a band from San José, Costa Rica
 Evolución (Aterciopelados album), 2002
 Evolución (Menudo album), 1984
Evolución (political coalition), Argentine political party